Neostasina is a genus of spiders in the family Sparassidae. It was first described in 2016 by Rheims & Alayón. , it contains 34 species, all found in the Caribbean.

Species
Neostasina comprises the following species:
Neostasina aceitillar Rheims & Alayón, 2022 - Dominican Rep.
Neostasina amalie Rheims & Alayón, 2016 - British Virgin Is.
Neostasina antiguensis (Bryant, 1923) - Antigua and Barbuda (Antigua)
Neostasina bani Rheims & Alayón, 2022 - Dominican Rep.
Neostasina baoruco Rheims & Alayón, 2016 - Dominican Rep.
Neostasina bermudezi Rheims & Alayón, 2016 - Dominican Rep.
Neostasina bicolor (Banks, 1914) - Jamaica, Haiti, Dominican Rep., Puerto Rico 
Neostasina bryantae Rheims & Alayón, 2016 - Cuba
Neostasina cachote Rheims & Alayón, 2016 - Dominican Rep. 
Neostasina croix Rheims & Alayón, 2016 - Virgin Is.
Neostasina demaco Rheims & Alayón, 2022 - Dominican Rep.
Neostasina elverde Rheims & Alayón, 2016 - Puerto Rico
Neostasina granpiedra Rheims & Alayón, 2016 - Cuba
Neostasina guanaboa Rheims & Alayón, 2016 - Jamaica
Neostasina gunboat Rheims & Alayón, 2016 - Jamaica
Neostasina iberia Rheims & Alayón, 2016 - Cuba
Neostasina jamaicana Rheims & Alayón, 2016 - Jamaica
Neostasina juanita Rheims & Alayón, 2022 - Puerto Rico
Neostasina liguanea Rheims & Alayón, 2016 - Jamaica
Neostasina lucasi (Bryant, 1940) - Cuba
Neostasina lucea Rheims & Alayón, 2016 - Jamaica
Neostasina macleayi (Bryant, 1940) - Cuba
Neostasina maisi Rheims & Alayón, 2022 - Cuba
Neostasina mammee Rheims & Alayón, 2016 - Jamaica
Neostasina maroon Rheims & Alayón, 2016 - Jamaica
Neostasina montegordo Rheims & Alayón, 2016 - Cuba
Neostasina oualie Rheims & Alayón, 2016 - St. Kitts and Nevis (Nevis)
Neostasina paraiso Rheims & Alayón, 2022 - Puerto Rico
Neostasina saetosa (Bryant, 1948) - Dominican Rep., Puerto Rico, Virgin Is.  
Neostasina siempreverde Rheims & Alayón, 2016 - Cuba
Neostasina taino Rheims & Alayón, 2016 - Dominican Rep., Puerto Rico
Neostasina toronegro Rheims & Alayón, 2022 - Puerto Rico
Neostasina turquino Rheims & Alayón, 2016 - Cuba
Neostasina virginensis Rheims & Alayón, 2016 - Virgin Is.

References

Sparassidae
Araneomorphae genera
Spiders of the Caribbean